Sukadana is a town and regency seat of North Kayong Regency (Kabupaten Kayong Utara), on the island of Borneo. North Kayong regency is one of the regencies of West Kalimantan province in Indonesia. The nearest airport is Rahadi Osman-Ketapang Ketapang Airport.

History
Sukadana used to be a capital city of a Malay kingdom called Tanjungpura. It was referred to by Seventeenth and Eighteenth-century European writers as Succadano or Succadana, noted for its port, and described as being "in the land of Candavangan" (i.e. Kendawangan). Succadano was also, confusingly, the name given to the Banjarmasin river, which flows south to meet the sea at Banjarmasin in southeastern Borneo, on the other side of the island.

Economy
The main industries consists in the production of palm oil, rubber, and wood.

Education
The current political leadership has made commitments to provide free education and health care to all residents and primary and secondary school fees that are paid elsewhere in Indonesia have been waived. There are no institutes of higher education.

Health
The local government provides free public healthcare through clinics throughout the province, including a "floating clinic" based on a boat to serve the islands off the west coast of the regency. The NGO Alam Sehat Lestari (ASRI) also operates a clinic in Sukadana, which offers community-oriented conservation initiatives, such as offering discounted care to locals who commit to curbing illegal logging in the Gunung Palung National Park. The nearest hospitals are in the neighboring regency of Ketapang.

Demographics

Transportation
The nearest airport is Rahadi Osman (Ketapang Airport). The airport has some connecting flights to Pontianak, Semarang via Pangkalan Bun, and Jakarta.  Boats from Sukadana, Teluk Melano and Teluk Batang run daily to Pontianak.

Places
Gunung Palung National Park, a rainforest park that can be reached from Sukadana
 Pulau Datok beach (拿督岛滩)

Hotels

The largest hotel is the Makhota Kayong in Sukadana.

References

Populated places in West Kalimantan
Port cities and towns in Indonesia
Regency seats of West Kalimantan